Bial is a pharmaceutical company based in Portugal.

Bial or BIAL may also refer to:

People with the surname
 Deborah Bial (born 1965), American educationist, founded the Posse Foundation
 Manfred Bial (1870–1908), German physician
 Pedro Bial (born 1958), Brazilian journalist, TV producer and presenter (hosts Brazil's Big Brother)
 Rudolf Bial, (1834–1881), German-American violinist, composer, impresario

Other uses
 BIAL, Bengaluru International Airport in Bangalore, India
 BIAL IT Investment Region in Bangalore, India
 Piz Bial, a mountain in Switzerland